Gabrielle is a 2005 French film directed by Patrice Chéreau. It is a screen adaptation of Joseph Conrad's short story The Return.

Plot
Jean Harvey and his wife Gabrielle are renowned within Paris' haute bourgeoisie for the salons they host each Thursday evening.

Jean and Gabrielle live a comfortable yet regimented life in a well-appointed Paris mansion, assisted by a retinue of devoted servants. Yet their marriage is more of a contract than a relationship. Jean confides to the audience that he loves Gabrielle "as a collector loves his most prized object."

On their 10th anniversary, Jean comes home to find a note from Gabrielle in which she writes that within the hour she will have left to meet her lover.

Jean spends several minutes digesting the meaning of the note. Gabrielle returns shortly, though, and Jean and Gabrielle reflect on their marriage for the remainder of the film.

Notes
Gabrielle opened in the United States on 14 July 2006 at the Lincoln Plaza Cinemas and the IFC Center in Manhattan. It was also available that weekend to many home cable subscribers throughout the U.S. via video on demand through IFC. Subsequent release dates were July 28, 2006 in Boston and 4 August 2006 in Los Angeles.

Cast
Isabelle Huppert as Gabrielle Hervey
Pascal Greggory as Jean Hervey
Claudia Coli as Yvonne, Gabrielle's maid
Chantal Neuwirth as Madeleine
Thierry Hancisse as Editor in Chief of Jean's financial publication
Jeanne Herry as The maid
Raina Kabaivanska as a singer and pianist

Reception
On review aggregator Rotten Tomatoes, Gabrielle holds an approval rating of 74%, based on 54 reviews, and an average rating of 6.7/10. Its consensus reads, "Patrice Chéreau's exquisite rendering of Joseph Conrad's The Return brings underlying passions to surface in a long-suffering marriage". On Metacritic, the film has a weighted average score of 79 out of 100, based on 20 critics, indicating "Generally favorable reviews". Gabrielle was placed at 89 on Slant Magazines best films of the 2000s.

Accolades 
2006 César Awards
Won: Best Costume Design (Caroline de Vivaise) 
Won: Best Production Design (Olivier Radot) 
Nominated: Best Actress – Leading Role (Isabelle Huppert)
Nominated: Best Cinematography (Eric Gautier)
Nominated: Best Sound (Olivier Dô Hùu, Benoît Hillebrant and Guillaume Sciama) 
Nominated: Best Writing – Adaptation (Patrice Chéreau and Anne-Louise Trividic)
2005 Venice Film Festival
Nominated: Golden Lion (Patrice Chéreau)

See also
 Isabelle Huppert on screen and stage

References

External links

2005 drama films
2005 films
Films based on short fiction
Films based on works by Joseph Conrad
Films directed by Patrice Chéreau
Films featuring a Best Actress Lumières Award-winning performance
French drama films
2000s French-language films
2000s French films